Jushan Bai is a Chinese American economist. He is a professor of economics at Columbia University.

Biography 
Bai received his B.A. from Nankai University in 1985, M.A. from Pennsylvania State University in 1988, and Ph.D. from University of California, Berkeley in 1992. He taught at Massachusetts Institute of Technology, Boston College, and New York University before joining the Columbia faculty in 2008.

Bai specializes in econometrics and is hailed as one of the most prominent economists of Chinese descent by the Chinese press. He was elected a fellow of the Econometric Society in 2013.

References 

Living people
Chinese economists
American economists
Nankai University alumni
Pennsylvania State University alumni
University of California, Berkeley alumni
Columbia University faculty
Massachusetts Institute of Technology faculty
Boston College faculty
New York University faculty
Fellows of the Econometric Society
Year of birth missing (living people)